Vintilă Cossini (21 November 1913 – 24 June 2000) was a Romanian football midfielder who played for Romania in the 1938 FIFA World Cup. He spent most of his career playing for Rapid București.

Honours
Rapid București
Cupa României (5): 1936–37, 1937–38, 1938–39, 1939–40, 1940–41

References

External links

1913 births
Romanian footballers
Romania international footballers
Association football midfielders
Liga I players
FC Rapid București players
1938 FIFA World Cup players
2000 deaths
Sportspeople from Constanța